Norman Lamont Hand (September 4, 1972 – May 14, 2010) was an American football defensive tackle in the NFL.  He last played with the New York Giants in 2004.  He also played with the Seattle Seahawks, the New Orleans Saints, the San Diego Chargers and the Miami Dolphins.  With the Saints, Hand was part of a defensive line nicknamed "The Heavy Lunch Bunch", along with fellow 325-pounders Martin Chase and Grady Jackson. Hand was noted for his "Big Wiggle" celebration dance, and in 2000 he was part of the team that won the Saints' first playoff game.

High school career 
At Walterboro High School in Walterboro, South Carolina, Hand earned three letters in football, and also played baseball.  As a senior, he was an honorable mention All-America selection by Parade and USA Today, and was the South Carolina High School Defensive Lineman of the Year.  As a junior tight end, he caught 25 passes for 526 yards (21.04 yards per reception average).

College career 
At Itawamba Junior College in Mississippi, he finished his two-year career with 18 sacks, 135 tackles, 33 tackles for loss, four forced fumbles, and three fumble recoveries.

Norman Hand was a two-year starter at the University of Mississippi after transferring from Itawamba Junior College.  As a senior, he posted 3.5 sacks, 61 tackles (three for losses), one interception, and one fumble recovery, and was a second-team All-SEC selection.

Death 
Hand died on May 14, 2010 from hypertensive heart disease, after collapsing at his house in Walterboro.

References 

1972 births
2010 deaths
Sportspeople from Queens, New York
Players of American football from New York City
American football defensive tackles
Itawamba Indians football players
Ole Miss Rebels football players
New York Giants players
Seattle Seahawks players
New Orleans Saints players
San Diego Chargers players
Miami Dolphins players
People from Walterboro, South Carolina
Deaths from hypertension